Joseph Dixon (3 September 1895 – 19 November 1954) was an English cricketer. He played for Essex between 1914 and 1922.

References

External links

1895 births
1954 deaths
English cricketers
Essex cricketers
Sportspeople from Chelmsford
English cricketers of 1919 to 1945